The 2023 Cornell Big Red football team will represent Cornell University as a member of the Ivy League during the 2023 NCAA Division I FCS football season. The team will be led by tenth-year head coach David Archer and play their home games at Schoellkopf Field.

Previous season

The Big Red finished the 2022 season with an overall record of 5–5 and a mark of 2–5 in conference play to finish in a tie for sixth place in the Ivy League.

Schedule

References

Cornell
Cornell Big Red football seasons
Cornell Big Red football